The 1932–33 season was the 33rd season of competitive football in Belgium. RU Saint-Gilloise won their 9th Premier Division title.

Overview
At the end of the season, RFC Brugeois and Berchem Sport were relegated to the Division I, while Belgica FC Edegem (Division I A winner) and R Tilleur FC (Division I B winner) were promoted to the Premier Division. The Promotion was won by CS Saint-Josse, Cappellen FC, Wallonia Namur and Patria FC Tongres. The four clubs were promoted to the Division I while R Knokke FC, Oude God Sport, RFC Montegnée and EFC Hasselt were relegated from the Division I to the Promotion.

National team

* Belgium score given first

Key
 H = Home match
 A = Away match
 N = On neutral ground
 F = Friendly
 o.g. = own goal

Honours

Final league tables

Premier Division

References
RSSSF archive – Final tables 1895–2002
Belgian clubs history 
FA website